Karpenkovo is a rural locality (a selo) and the administrative center of Karpenkovskoye Rural Settlement, Kamensky District, Voronezh Oblast, Russia. The population was 883 as of 2010. There are 10 streets.

Geography 
Karpenkovo is located 15 km southwest of Kamenka (the district's administrative centre) by road. Degtyarnoye is the nearest rural locality.

References 

Rural localities in Kamensky District, Voronezh Oblast